Women Are Angels (French: Les femmes sont des anges) is a 1952 French comedy film directed by Marcel Aboulker and starring Viviane Romance, Jeanne Fusier-Gir and André Gabriello.

Cast
 Viviane Romance as Edmée Clotier
 Jeanne Fusier-Gir as Léontine
 André Gabriello as Le brigadier
 Jacques Grello as Léon Clotier
 Jacques Fabbri as Théodore
 Charles Vissières as Pelure 
 Robert Vattier as Le docteur
 Jean Parédès as Philogène
 Julien Maffre as Le facteur
 Pierre Moncorbier as Le notaire

References

Bibliography 
 Rège, Philippe. Encyclopedia of French Film Directors, Volume 1. Scarecrow Press, 2009.

External links 
 

1952 films
French comedy films
1952 comedy films
1950s French-language films
Films directed by Marcel Aboulker
French films based on plays
1950s French films

fr:Les Femmes sont des anges